Park Avenue Tower (also 65 East 55th Street) is a building on Park Avenue, between 55th Street and 56th Street, in Midtown Manhattan, New York City. Park Avenue Tower has 36 floors, which can be reached with seventeen elevators. Designed by Murphy/Jahn Architects in postmodern style, Park Avenue Tower is made of stone, steel and glass. The floor plan of the building is a square with flattened corners and the tower narrows as it increases in height. There is a pyramid-shaped structure on the roof of the building that is not visible from the street.

In front of the Park Avenue Tower main entrance on 55th Street is a Privately Owned Public Space with six polished granite planters. The building can be accessed through four entrances, one on 56th Street and three on 55th Street. The entrance on 56th Street and the middle entrance on 55th Street lead to the multi-story lobby. The walls of the lobby are made of granite and marble. The fourth entrance leads to Restaurant Aquavit, a restaurant with two Michelin stars.

Site
Park Avenue Tower is located in Midtown Manhattan on the west side of Park Avenue between 55th Street and 56th Street. The building is close to four New York City Subway stations in the immediate area: Fifth Avenue-59th Street (serving the ), 57th Street, Fifth Avenue/53rd Street, and Lexington Avenue/59th Street.

Park Avenue Tower borders three buildings, namely the Café Cosí in the northwest, the New York Friars Club in the southwest and 430 Park Avenue in the east. On the other side of 56th Street is 432 Park Avenue, while on the other side of 55th Street are Park Avenue Place, the Heron Tower and 410 Park Avenue. In addition, 550 Madison Avenue is to the west and 590 Madison Avenue is to the northwest.

History 
In 2007, Macklowe Properties bought the Park Avenue Tower along with five other buildings in New York for $7 billion from the Blackstone Group, which had acquired the building by acquiring Equity Office Properties, the previous owner. One year later, in the summer of 2008, the building, along with the 21-story 850 Third Avenue, was sold to Shorenstein Properties for $930 million, as Macklowe Properties faced challenges during the credit crisis. At the end of 2013, it was announced that Grocon wanted to buy the Park Avenue Tower for $500 million, which later became $775 million. In the spring of 2014, that deal was canceled when Grocon could not raise sufficient funding. Grocon had secured a $530 million loan from Jones Lang LaSalle, but could not obtain further funding. In July 2014, the building was sold again to a previous owner,  Blackstone Group for $750 million

References

External links 

 
 Shorenstein – Park Avenue Tower Accessed on 22 July 2014
 "Park Avenue Tower Trade Comes Undone". Real Estate Alert (2 April 2014) Accessed on 23 July 2014

Park Avenue
Midtown Manhattan
Office buildings in Manhattan
Office buildings completed in 1986
Helmut Jahn buildings
1986 establishments in New York City